That of acting president of the Russian Federation is a temporary post provided by the Constitution of Russia. The acting president is a person who fulfills the duties of the president of the Russian Federation when cases of incapacity and vacancy occur. However the person who takes office is more limited in power as the acting president can not dissolve the State Duma, call a referendum, or propose constitutional amendments. This post is held by the prime minister of Russia.

Incapacity

1996
Prime Minister Viktor Chernomyrdin assumed the role of acting president when President Boris Yeltsin underwent heart surgery. Chernomyrdin served for one day, from 5 to 6 November 1996. No major event occurred during that time.

Vacancy

1993
During the 1993 Russian constitutional crisis, Vice President Alexander Rutskoy was named by parliament as the acting president when the legislature announced Yeltsin's removal from office. On 21 September 1993 at 12:22 a.m., Rutskoy assumed the powers of acting president of Russia. He took the presidential oath, stating, "I am taking the authority of President. The anti-constitutional decree of President Yeltsin is annulled."

Rutskoy's interim presidency, although constitutional, was never acknowledged outside of Russia. After the two-week standoff and the violence on the streets of Moscow, on 4 October 1993 the parliament building was taken by Yeltsin's military forces. Rutskoy and his supporters were arrested and charged with organization of mass disturbances. On the same day, Yeltsin officially dismissed Rutskoy as vice president and fired him from the military forces. The vice presidency was abolished.

1999–2000
After Yeltsin's resignation on 31 December 1999, Prime Minister Vladimir Putin became the acting president until election. A snap election was held in March 2000 and was won by Putin. He officially took office of President on 7 May 2000.

Legislative gap
The Russian Constitution does not explicitly specify who should become acting president if the prime minister is not appointed or is unable to perform his or her duties. This gap is to some extent filled by the Federal Constitutional Law "About the Government of the Russian Federation", article 8 of which states:

Accordingly, if it is assumed that the performance of the duties of the president in urgent cases is one of the direct duties of the prime minister, and his deputies are authorized to perform all his duties in case of his absence, the duties of the president should be temporarily assigned to one of the deputy prime ministers in the order of substitution, established by the order of the prime minister. However, the legality of the temporary performance of the duties of the president by the deputy prime ministers is groundless, both from practical and theoretical positions. So far, these gaps in the legislation have not yet manifested themselves.

On the other hand, some believe that if the prime minister cannot serve as acting president, the acting president should be the chairman of the Federation Council. However, nowhere in the legislation is this fixed.

List

References
Constitution of the Russian Federation

 
Government of Russia
Politics of Russia